Robert Sidney may refer to:

Robert Sidney, 1st Earl of Leicester (1563–1626), English nobleman and statesman
Robert Sidney, 2nd Earl of Leicester (1595–1677), son of the above
Robert Sidney, 4th Earl of Leicester (1649–1702)
Robert Sidney (choreographer) (1909–2008), American choreographer

See also
Dennis Danvers for Robert Sydney, science fiction author